is the sixteenth single released by Japanese hip-hop group Lead, released over a year after their previous single on 5 August 2009 (Sunnyday was released at the end of July 2008). The single charted in the top twenty of the Oricon charts, taking the No. 12 spot for the week and remaining on the charts for four weeks.

The single was released in four CD+DVD combo packs, with each version corresponding to a member of the group. Each edition contained a bonus song, which was performed as a solo by whichever member's edition was purchased. The b-side "High Tension Day", however, was performed by all members and available on all versions.

"GiraGira Romantic" also became the official starting point for the group's annual releases. For the next four years, the group would only release one single, which would be released during the summer months. It also became their final single under the Pony Canyon sub-label Flight Master, whereas they would move to the main label.

Information
"GiraGira Romantic" is the sixteenth domestic single released by the Japanese hip-hop group Lead on 5 August 2009. It became their first single in over a year, whereas their previous single, "Sunnyday," was released in July 2008. The single performed well on the Oricon Singles Charts, where it ranked at No. 14 for the week and remained on the charts for four consecutive weeks. The release of the single would become the official starting point of the group releasing only one single per year (despite the unofficial starting point being Sunnyday), which would be an annual summer single, for the four years. It would also be their final single released under the Pony Canyon sub-label Flight Master, whereas the group would move to the main label.

The single became the first time the group released multiple editions of a single, outside of the standard CD and CD+DVD combo packs. "GiraGira Romantic" did not receive a CD only version, instead having four separate CD+DVD editions. Each version corresponded to a member of the group, and contained a bonus coupling track that was performed as a solo by the member of the corresponding edition. The "Akira Ver." carried the track "Stay with me", performed by Akira Kagimoto; the "Shinya Ver." contained the track "Follow Me", performed by the group's rapper Shinya Tanuichi; the "Keita Ver." housed the song "You're the only one", and was performed by Keita Furuya; the "Hiroki Ver." carried the track "Kimi ~Sakura~" (君 〜さくら〜 / You ~Sakura~), and was performed by the group's lead vocalist Hiroki Nakadoi. The track "High Tension Day" (HighテンションDAY) was available on all editions, along with the instrumental to "GiraGira Romantic." The DVD of all versions carried the music video of "GiraGira Romantic", the off-shot making video and an instructional dance video.

"GiraGira Romantic" was composed by Japanese singer-songwriter Hiroaki Serizawa. Hirofumi Hibino and Toru Watanabe performed the song, while the lyrics were written by lyricist and novelist leonn. "High Tension Day" was composed by Seiji Motoyama and the members of Lead, the latter had also written the lyrics, while Seiji performed the piece. "Follow Me" was written and composed by DJ TAKU; however, Lead's main rapper, Shinya, wrote the lyrical portion. The tracks "Stay with me" and "You're the only one" were written and composed by Seiji Motoyama. The youngest member of Lead, Akira, wrote the lyrics to "Stay with me"; the group's second lead vocalist, Keita, along with Shinya, wrote the lyrics to "You're the only one" The song "Kimi ~Sakura~" was written and composed by Lead's main vocalist Hiroki, while Seiji Motoyama performed the instrumental.

"Gira gira" is a Japanese sound effect, which typically denotes something shiny or sparkling.

Track listing

Charts

References

External links
Lead Official Site

2009 singles
2009 songs
Pony Canyon singles
J-pop songs
Lead (band) songs